Baghat may refer to:
 Baghat, Hormozgan
 Baghat, Kerman